Major General Robert Emmet Callan (March 4, 1874 – November 20, 1936) was a distinguished United States Army Coast Artillery officer who served in the United States and overseas in places such as Puerto Rico, France and the Philippines. He saw frontline action in the Spanish–American War and World War I.

Early career

Callan was born on March 4, 1864, in Baltimore, Maryland. He attended the University of Tennessee from 1888 to 1891. After graduating from this school, he entered the United States Military Academy at West Point and graduated in 1896.

After graduating from West Point, Callan became a commissioned officer of the United States Army. He was a Second Lieutenant in the Fifth U.S. Artillery. He was in camp at Port Tampa, Florida, from May to June 2, 1898. He participated in the Puerto Rican Campaign of the Spanish–American War and was in action at Hormigueros, Puerto Rico on August 10, 1898. He also served in Cuba. Callan became a First Lieutenant on March 2, 1899, while serving in the Fifth U.S. Artillery.

Callan was an assistant professor of mathematics at West Point from 1899 to 1903. He then served in Washington, D.C. In 1917, he became chief of staff of the Philippine Department.

World War I
During World War I, Callan was on duty in France and was Chief of Staff of the 1st Army Artillery, Commanding General of the 33rd Artillery Brigade and participated in the Montdidier-Noyon Defensive and in the Aisne-Marne Offensive. He was awarded the Army Distinguished Service Medal for his service during World War I. The citation for the medal reads:

Later career

After World War I, General Callan served in New York, Panama and Hawaii before his promotion to major general in 1931. He was Assistant Chief of Staff in the War Department from 1931 to 1935. He commanded the Third Corps Area in Baltimore, Maryland, until retiring at his own request in 1936 after forty years of service.

Death and legacy
He died on November 20, 1936, in Washington, D.C., at age 62.

Awards and honors
In addition to receiving the Distinguished Service Medal, Callan was honored by the military in several other ways. Camp Callan, a World War II artillery training center, was named in his honor. He was also memorialized by the troopship .

France made him an officer of the Legion of Honour.

Italy recognized him with the Order of the Crown of Italy.

See also

References

Additional reading
The Coast Artillery Journal December 1924
Historic California Posts: Camp Callan

1874 births
1936 deaths
United States Military Academy alumni
American military personnel of the Spanish–American War
United States Army generals of World War I
Recipients of the Distinguished Service Medal (US Army)
United States Army generals
United States Military Academy faculty
Military personnel from Baltimore